Semir Mesanovic (born January 1, 1981) is a Bosnian-Canadian former footballer who played in the Canadian Professional Soccer League, USL A-League, Major Indoor Soccer League, Professional Arena Soccer League, and Premier League of America. Mesanovic currently coaches at the Indiana Elite Futball Club.

Playing career 
Mesanovic began his career in 1999 with London City in the Canadian Professional Soccer League. In his debut season he finished as the club's top goalscorer with 10 goals, and clinched a postseason berth. He was also selected for the CPSL All-Star match against a CSA Canada Development Team though he played in the league he was selected for the Canada squad. For his impressive debut season he was recognized by the league with the Rookie of the Year award. He had several trials in Europe before returning to the CPSL to sign with Toronto Croatia in 2001.

In 2003, he signed with the Indiana Blast of the USL A-League, where he appeared in 11 matches and recorded 3 goals. The following season he signed with Minnesota Thunder. In 2015, he played with RWB Adria in the Premier League of America. During the winter seasons he played with several indoor clubs. In his debut season in the Major Indoor Soccer League with Milwaukee Wave he won the MISL Championship in 2003. During his time in the MISL he has played with Chicago Storm, California Cougars, Rockford Rampage, Philadelphia KiXX, Chicago Riot, and Chicago Soul FC. In the Major Arena Soccer League he played with Chicago Mustangs, Cedar Rapids Rampage, and Ontario Fury.

International career 
In 2003, he made his first appearance for the Canada U-23 national soccer team against US Virgin Islands.

References  

1981 births
Living people
Canadian soccer players
Canada men's under-23 international soccer players
Canadian expatriate soccer players
London City players
Toronto Croatia players
Indiana Blast players
Minnesota Thunder players
Milwaukee Wave players
Chicago Storm (MISL) players
California Cougars players
Rockford Rampage players
Philadelphia KiXX (2001–2008 MISL) players
Chicago Soul FC players
Chicago Mustangs (2012–) players
Canadian Soccer League (1998–present) players
A-League (1995–2004) players
Major Indoor Soccer League (2001–2008) players
Major Arena Soccer League players
Association football forwards
Ontario Fury players
Bosnia and Herzegovina emigrants to Canada